General elections were held in Palau in 1992 to elect a President, Vice-President, Senate and House of Delegates. The first round of the presidential election took place on 22 September, whilst the run-off election and the election for the House of Delegates and Senate took place on 4 November. All candidates ran as independents. Despite finishing second in the first round of voting, Kuniwo Nakamura was elected President, whilst Thomas Remengesau Jr. won the election for Vice-President. Voter turnout was 74.3% in the presidential elections on 22 September and 83.9% on 4 November, and 83.2% for the legislative elections.

Results

President

Vice-President

Senate

House of Delegates

References

Palau
General
Elections in Palau
Non-partisan elections
Presidential elections in Palau